Kevin David Petersen (born December 14, 1964) is an American small business owner and Republican politician.  He is a member of the Wisconsin State Assembly, representing Waupaca and Waushara counties since 2007.

Biography

Petersen was born in Waupaca, Wisconsin, and graduated from Waupaca High School in 1983. After graduation, he served in the U.S. Navy in submarine service from 1983 to 1994. Petersen received a Bachelor of Science degree in mechanical engineering from the University of New Mexico in 1989. After leaving the U.S. Navy in 1994, Petersen remained with the U.S. Navy Reserve until 2008.

Petersen served as a Town of Dayton supervisor from 2001 to 2007. He won a three-way primary in 2006 to become the Republican candidate for Wisconsin State Assembly in the 40th district and went on to narrowly defeat Democrat Dan Naylor in the general election.  He is currently in his 8th term and has served as Assistant Majority Leader since 2021.

References

External links
 
 
 Official website
 Representative Kevin Petersen at Wisconsin Legislature
 40th Assembly District map (2011–2021)

1964 births
21st-century American politicians
Living people
Military personnel from Wisconsin
People from Dayton, Waupaca County, Wisconsin
People from Waupaca, Wisconsin
Republican Party members of the Wisconsin State Assembly
University of New Mexico alumni